Mary of Baux-Orange (died 1417) was suo jure Princess of Orange.  She was the last holder of this title from the House of Baux.

Life 
Marie was the only child and therefore the sole heiress of Raymond V of Baux and Joan of Geneva. On 11 April 1386, she married John III, the son of Louis I, Lord of Châlon-Arlay and Margaret of Vienne. They had: 
Louis II, nicknamed Louis the Good (1390-1463)

Mary died in  1417 in Orange and was buried in L'église des Cordeliers at Lons-le-Saunier.  Her husband died in 1418.  Louis II inherited Châlon-Arlay from his father and Baux-Orange, including the Principality of Orange, from his mother.  He claimed to have also inherited the County of Geneva via his grandmother, but lost a lengthy legal battle over this claim against the House of Savoy.

See also 
 Lords of Baux
 Château des Baux
 House of Chalon-Arlay
 Principality of Orange

References

Sources

External links 
 Genealogy Marie de Baux
 Official site of the del Balzo/Baux family 

Princes of Orange
1417 deaths
House of Baux
Chalon-Arlay
Year of birth unknown